Gerd Roellecke (1927 in Iserlohn, North Rhine-Westphalia, Germany – 2011 in Karlsruhe, Baden-Württemberg, Germany) was a German researcher, lawyer, philosopher and former professor for public law and philosophy at the University of Mannheim from 1969 to 1999. Moreover, he served as rector at the University of Mannheim between 1982 and 1985.

Education
Roellecke studied law and economics from 1948 to 1952 at the universities in Würzburg and Freiburg where he obtained his first Staatsexamen. Afterwards, he obtained his second Staatsexamen at the University of Düsseldorf and his doctorate in law as well as his habilitation in 1969 at the University of Mainz.

Academics
Roellecke worked from 1969 until he became emeritus in 1995 as chaired professor for public law and law philosophy at the University of Mannheim (UMA). Between 1970 and 1973 he was vicepresident of the university and from 1982 to 1985 president (Rektor). He was succeeded by Heinrich Chantraine in his role as rector of the university.  
In 1999 he received the Merit Cross 1st Class and became honorary member of the German Research Institute for Public Administration in 2001.

Publications
 Patrick Bahners, Gerd Roellecke (Hrsg.): Preußische Stile : ein Staat als Kunststück, Stuttgart : Klett-Cotta 2001, .
 Über immanente Grenzen der richterlichen Gewalt des Bundesverfassungsgerichtes, Freiburg im Breisgau 1960, zugl. Diss., Univ. Freiburg 1960.
 Der Begriff des positiven Gesetzes und das Grundgesetz, Mainz 1969, zugl. Habil.-Schrift, Univ. Mainz 1969.
 Verfassungsgebende Gewalt als Ideologie, in: JZ 1992, S. 929 bis 934.
 Die Entkoppelung von Recht und Religion, in: JZ 2004, S. 105 bis 110.
 Religion - Recht - Kultur und die Eigenwilligkeit der Systeme: Überarbeitete Fassung eines Vortrags gehalten vor der „Juristischen Gesellschaft zu Berlin“ am 9. Mai 2007, De Gruyter Recht, Berlin 2007, .

See also
 List of University of Mannheim people
 List of University of Mainz people
 University of Mannheim
 Karlsruhe
 Baden-Württemberg

Notes

External links
 List of Publications of Gerd Roellecke

1927 births
Jurists from North Rhine-Westphalia
2011 deaths
Academic staff of the University of Mannheim
Academic staff of Johannes Gutenberg University Mainz
German philosophers
People from Iserlohn
German male writers
Officers Crosses of the Order of Merit of the Federal Republic of Germany